The Governor of Labuan was the appointed head of the government of Labuan.

From 1848 to 1890, the governors were appointed by the British authorities in London. When the administration was taken over by the North Borneo Chartered Company in 1890, the company became responsible for the appointment of the governors until the Straits Settlements administration took over in 1906.

List of governors appointed by the Crown

List of governors appointed by the North Borneo Company

List of governors appointed by the Straits Settlements

Sources
 List of Labuan Governors on World Statesmen

Labuan
Governors
Labuan, Governors